Nathan MacQueen (born 24 June 1991) is a British Paralympic archer. He has competed at the Summer Paralympics.

He was involved in a near-fatal motorcycle accident aged 17 and was left paralysed. Before the crash, he had played rugby for Scotland at under-21 level and was part of the Scottish archery team.

References

External links 
 
 

1991 births
Living people
Scottish male archers
Paralympic archers of Great Britain
Archers at the 2016 Summer Paralympics